Tavilzhanka is a village in Kupiansk Raion, Kharkiv Oblast, Ukraine. During the 2022 Russian invasion of Ukraine, the village was occupied by Russian troops during their initial advance into the nation. After the success of the 2022 Ukrainian eastern counteroffensive, the village became disputed territory on 22 September, and would remain that way for some time, with Ukrainian forces possibly taking control by 27 December, according to the Institute for the Study of War. The recapture of the village most notably restored Ukrainian access to the P79 road above, which could potentially cut off supply to the Russian forces to the south in the Kharkiv Oblast, which made it a significant point of combat.

Geography 
After one kilometer, this river connects to the left tributary of the larger Oskil (river), downstream from the village of Dvorichna, where the closest major railway station, is located.

History

2022 Russian invasion 
At the beginning of the 2022 Russian invasion of Ukraine, Tavilzhanka was occupied by Russian troops in their initial advance into Ukraine. On 22 September 2022, prominent Russian milblogger Rybar reported that the Ukrainian armed forces reached and began fighting for the village in part of their Kharkiv counteroffensive, which had begun earlier in the month. Advancing from Horobivka and Dvorichna, further progress was made on 25 September by the Ukrainian forces when a foothold was established by nearby railroad tracks in the village. From 25 to 27 September, further fighting reported as "intense" took place in the western part of the village. 

Over the following months, it remained a contested frontline village, with control of the settlement unclear due to the fog of war, but likely trading hands between the two sides multiple times.

Demographics

In 2001, the village had 1924 residents, of whom 1792 spoke Ukrainian, 108 Russian, 5 Hungarian, 3 Belarusian, 9 Armenian, and 7 spoke other languages.

See also 
 Russian occupation of Kharkiv Oblast

References

External links 
 Village weather forecast

Populated places established in 1899
Villages in Kupiansk Raion